Pariz (also Romanized as Pārīz; also known as Rīz and Bariz) is a city and capital of Pariz District, in Sirjan County, Kerman Province, Iran.  At the 2006 census, its population was 4,527, in 1,231 families.

References

Populated places in Sirjan County
Cities in Kerman Province